Gunnar Uldall (17 November 1940 – 14 November 2017) was a German politician and former state minister of Economy and Labour in Hamburg. He was a member of the Christian Democratic Union (CDU).

Uldall was born on 17 November 1940 in Hamburg, he was married with 3 children. After his Abitur in 1960 and his conscription to the armed forces (1960–1962),  Uldall studied economics at the University of Hamburg and earned his degree in 1966. From 1966 he worked as a management consultant.

In 1962 Uldall became a member of the CDU and was elected to the Hamburg Parliament in 1966. He was a member of the state legislative until 1983, when he was elected to the German federal diet until 2001. From 2001 to 2008 Uldall was state minister of Economic Affairs and Employment.

Uldall died on 14 November 2017, shortly before his 77th birthday.

References

External links 

1940 births
2017 deaths
Members of the Bundestag for Hamburg
Members of the Bundestag 1998–2002
Members of the Bundestag 1994–1998
Members of the Bundestag 1990–1994
Members of the Hamburg Parliament
Senators of Hamburg
Members of the Bundestag for the Christian Democratic Union of Germany